Giles Thomas is a British actor, known for his portrayal of Doug in E4's series Skins.  He also played Private Francis in Dennis Potter's Lipstick on Your Collar.

Filmography

Film

Television

References

Welsh actors
Living people

Year of birth missing (living people)